William Henry Boulton (April 19, 1812 – February 15, 1874) was a lawyer and political figure in Canada West. He served as Mayor of Toronto from 1845 to 1847, and in 1858. He was also a member of the Orange Order in Canada.  Boulton died in Toronto in 1874.

Life and career
Boulton was born in York (Toronto) in Upper Canada in 1812, the son of D'Arcy Boulton (1785–1846) and the grandson of G. D'Arcy Boulton. He studied law and entered practice with Gamble and Boulton. He was also a keen cricketer, and his public support of the Canadian cricket team is said to have significantly furthered his political ambitions.

He was first elected to Toronto city council in 1838. In 1844, he was elected to the Legislative Assembly of the Province of Canada, representing Toronto as a Conservative member, and he was re-elected in 1848 and 1851. He opposed the bill making King's College a secular institution; at that time, it was affiliated with the Church of England in Canada. He supported making the Legislative Council elective. He was supported by the Orange Order in Toronto and was also viewed as a member of the Family Compact. In 1854, he became deputy grand master for the order in British North America. After he left politics, he continued to practise law.

His former residence, "The Grange", is now part of the Art Gallery of Ontario. The Boultons were said to be very hospitable people and hosted many guests at the Grange. Lord Elgin, when Governor-General of Canada, was a guest of Boulton in the home when he was Mayor of Toronto. It received the name the Grange after the family estate in England. Boulton lived in the home until his death in 1874.

References 

Biography at the Dictionary of Canadian Biography Online

Sources
 Adams, P. (2010) A history of Canadian cricket, lulu.com. . 

1812 births
1874 deaths
Canadian people of English descent
Members of the Legislative Assembly of the Province of Canada from Canada West
Mayors of Toronto